Gullak is an Indian web series created by Shreyansh Pandey for the streaming service SonyLIV under the banner of The Viral Fever (TVF). The series revolves around the Mishra family, comprising Santosh and Shanti Mishra and their sons Anand "Annu" Mishra and Aman Mishra and features Jameel Khan, Geetanjali Kulkarni, Vaibhav Raj Gupta and Harsh Mayar in the respective mentioned lead roles, with Sunita Rajwar as their neighbour.

The first season premiered on the TVF's streaming platform TVF Play and on Sony Liv, on 27 June 2019, with all episodes aired on the same day. The show received positive response from audience.

The program was renewed for a second season with mostly new crew members. Palash Vaswani directed the series, Durgesh Singh was the primary writer and Anurag Saikia and Simran Hora composed the soundtrack. The second season aired through Sony Liv on 15 January 2021, and unlike the first season, it received mixed reviews from critics. The series has been renewed for a third season.

The trailer for Gullak Season 3 was released on 22 March 2022. The trailer received a positive response from the audience. The show was released on 7 April 2022 on SonyLIV.

Cast

Series overview

Episodes

Season 1

Season 2

Season 3

Reception
The series received critical acclaim for its emotional and nostalgic elements.

Archika Khurana of The Times Of India said, "The beauty of the series lies in its narrative, which is as promising as its prequels and easy to relate to."

The show was said to be, "An old-world charm of the modern Indian nuclear family." by Troy Ribeiro of IANS.

RJ Divya Solgama gave the series a 4/5 saying, "'The Most Lovable Family On OTT Are Back With Thrice Amount Of Love & Cuteness."

Desi Martini’s Mahima Pandey, with 4.5/5 said, "Mishra Parivaar is back with another perfect season; life gets tough but they still make us smile."

Sunidhi Prajapat of OTTPlay rated the series 4/5 and praised the show, "The new installment of the Mishra family’s adventures takes you on a rollercoaster ride of emotions."

Abhimanyu Mathur of Hindustan Times said "Gullak's third season does get more dramatic and darker this time. The themes tackled are more serious than the previous two seasons. The stakes, at times, seem higher. The show isn't as light as it once was. But it is still well made. Even if it tackles serious issues, it does not get preachy or judgemental. It retains that freshness."

Shubham Kulkarni of Koimoi rated the third season at a 3.5/5 and said, "Gullak 3 brings back the feel good factor with a pinch of nostalgia and a tablespoon full of emotions."

Saibal Chatterjee of NDTV criticized the third season, saying that "The Writing Isn't As Impeccable This Time Around But Acting Is Absolutely Top-Notch."

Pankaj Shukl, witring in Amar Ujala, rated its third season at a 3.5/5 praising the series cast.

References

External links
 

Indian drama web series
YouTube original programming
TVF Play Shows
2010s YouTube series
SonyLIV original films